The 1993–94 season of the Venezuelan Primera División, the top category of Venezuelan football, was played by 16 teams. The national champions were Caracas.

Results

Standings

External links
Venezuela 1993 season at RSSSF

Venezuelan Primera División seasons
Ven
Ven
1993–94 in Venezuelan football